Paroedura rennerae is a species of lizard in the family Gekkonidae. It is endemic to Madagascar.

References

Paroedura
Reptiles of Madagascar
Reptiles described in 2021
Taxa named by Aurélien Miralles
Taxa named by Angelica Crottini
Taxa named by Andolalao Rakotoarison
Taxa named by Mark D. Scherz
Taxa named by Jörn Köhler
Taxa named by Frank Glaw
Taxa named by Miguel Vences